Alex Groves is a British sailor.

Together with teammate Max Richardson Groves became third at the 2008 World Championships in the 29er boat by finishing behind Australian couples Steven Thomas/Jasper Warren and Byron White/William Ryan to claim the bronze.

Groves now studies Music at the University of Bristol.

Career highlights
World Championships
2008 - Sorrento,  3rd, 29er (with Max Richardson)

External links 
 
 29er World Championships
 Gold And Silver To Australia At 29er Worlds

British male sailors (sport)
Living people
Year of birth missing (living people)
29er class sailors